The CHE University Ranking is an annual ranking of German universities and colleges. It is a subject‐specific, multidimensional system aimed at providing information for students, with its main emphasis on teaching, rather than research. Introduced in 1998 and published by the Centre for Higher Education in cooperation with Die Zeit, it is the most comprehensive ranking of its kind in Germany.

Ranking 
The CHE University Ranking is a subject-specific ranking. Each subject at each university is evaluated based on up to 37 criteria, e.g. overall study situation or research orientation. The decision to include which criteria is decided in consultation with representatives of the faculty conferences, expert associations and student representatives, and may differ depending both on the subject and type of higher education institution.

The assessed criteria are not weighted, nor combined to produce an overall ranking; CHE argues that there would no theoretical nor an empirical basis for such an aggregated value. Instead, the CHE University Ranking is multidimensional and solely shows the individual criteria. However, the ranking lists for each subject initially show a set of four to six pre-selected criteria, which may vary depending on the subject. The reader is invited to create their personal ranking.

The top and bottom groups are arranged to deviate to a statistically significant degree from the arithmetic mean.

Criteria include:
 Academic studies and teaching (courses offered, exams, interdisciplinary, study organisation, study situation, etc.)
 Job market and career-orientation (contact with work environment, job market preparation, etc.)
 Research (research reputation, citations per publication, doctorates per professor, publications per academic, etc.)
 Equipment (IT infrastructure, library, facilities, etc.)
 International orientation
 Result of study (graduates per year, exam results, period of study, etc.)
 Students (acceptance rate, gender balance, etc.)
 Town and University (population, public transport, tuition fees, etc.)

History 
In the late 1980s, newspapers started compiling the first university rankings in Germany. The Centre for Higher Education considered those methods inadequate and started constructing their own ranking based on sound methodology and with involvement of the universities themselves.

In 1998, CHE published its first ranking in co-operation with Stiftung Warentest. The first ranking solely analyzed the subjects business administration and chemistry. In subsequent years, the range of subjects analyzed has been continually expanded. From 1999 until 2004, the ranking was issued with the German magazine Stern. Since 2005 it has been published by the German weekly newspaper Die Zeit.

Methodology 
In contrast to other university rankings, the CHE University Ranking incorporates more aspects of teaching rather than research.

To evaluate teaching, it uses surveys of undergraduate and graduate students and professors. To evaluate research, it uses faculty surveys, bibliometric analysis, survey of university administrators and analysis of other data sources.

Reception 
The CHE University Ranking has faced criticism for neither publishing the data set itself, nor a detailed scientific description of its methodology. In particular, critics have pointed out several weaknesses in the CHE ranking:
 The criterion "recommendation of professors for a course of study" has only little significance, since it is doubtful whether external professors can actually express a qualified opinion on studying at another university.
 Research award winners are not taken into account at all in the research ranking.
 For reasons of information privacy, survey documents are distributed by the colleges or universities, rather than by CHE directly. This may allow for arbitrary manipulation by the colleges or universities.
 Ranking parameters and samples are set arbitrarily. For example, it is criticized that the samples are often too small to provide meaningful results.
 Multiple responses are not standardized, e.g. in the area of research strength by professors. This makes the results incomparable for the reader and leads to confusion, since a relative comparison is no longer possible - even though results are given in percentages.
 In some cases, there are considerable data gaps in the CHE ranking (e.g. number of graduates or average grade), so that the universities are not comparable.

In 2007, Switzerland and Austria withdrew from the CHE University Ranking, citing significant data and methodological deficiencies. Some university departments, most notably in the fields of sociology, history, and media studies, have boycotted the ranking, leading to some subjects completely being excluded.

In contrast, the Educational Policy Institute has called the CHE ranking as "nothing less than brilliant" in a comparison of 19 international university rankings. Unlike "rankings with often questionable indicators", the German ranking actively involves the universities in its compilation and thus achieves a "high data quality at the institute level." In 2005, the European University Association claimed that "the system used by CHE to evaluate universities is probably the best model available in the world of higher education".

References 

1998 introductions
University and college rankings